Murrays Bay is a small suburb in the East Coast Bays region, located in the North Shore of Auckland. The suburb is roughly the same size as Rothesay Bay, the suburb to the immediate north. It is primarily a residential area but does have a community centre, restaurant and café. Murrays Bay is regularly serviced by buses which go to Takapuna and the Auckland city centre.

History

The bay is named after Joseph Murray, who purchased a large section of the area, eventually expanding his land to 174 acres.

Demographics

Murrays Bay had a population of 4,764 at the 2018 New Zealand census, an increase of 60 people (1.3%) since the 2013 census, and an increase of 183 people (4.0%) since the 2006 census. There were 1,554 households, comprising 2,322 males and 2,442 females, giving a sex ratio of 0.95 males per female, with 867 people (18.2%) aged under 15 years, 960 (20.2%) aged 15 to 29, 2,310 (48.5%) aged 30 to 64, and 627 (13.2%) aged 65 or older.

Ethnicities were 71.2% European/Pākehā, 4.3% Māori, 1.0% Pacific peoples, 25.8% Asian, and 3.5% other ethnicities. People may identify with more than one ethnicity.

The percentage of people born overseas was 45.4, compared with 27.1% nationally.

Although some people chose not to answer the census's question about religious affiliation, 54.9% had no religion, 35.1% were Christian, 0.1% had Māori religious beliefs, 1.0% were Hindu, 0.8% were Muslim, 1.4% were Buddhist and 1.8% had other religions.

Of those at least 15 years old, 1,458 (37.4%) people had a bachelor's or higher degree, and 264 (6.8%) people had no formal qualifications. 1,104 people (28.3%) earned over $70,000 compared to 17.2% nationally. The employment status of those at least 15 was that 1,929 (49.5%) people were employed full-time, 642 (16.5%) were part-time, and 138 (3.5%) were unemployed.

Beach

Murrays Bay beach has a wharf that people jump off and fish in the Spring/Summer. There is a walkway to Rothesay Bay and Mairangi Bay. There is a sailing club that sails from the beach regularly.

Governance

Murrays Bay is under the local governance of the Auckland Council.

Education

Both schools are coeducational, and have a decile rating of 10Z. The two schools share a site, and were established in 1958.

Murrays bay stabbing incident: at June 23, 2022, a man stabbed several people and being captured by police.

Notes

External links
 Murrays Bay School website
 Murrays Bay Intermediate website
 Photographs of Murrays Bay held in Auckland Libraries' heritage collections.

Suburbs of Auckland
North Shore, New Zealand
Bays of the Auckland Region
East Coast Bays
Beaches of the Auckland Region